Lemington is an area and electoral ward of Newcastle upon Tyne in North East England.

History
Lemington has a strong industrial history. It is famous for its brick glassworks cone, built in 1787. The River Tyne used to pass very close to Lemington, until the Tyne Improvement Commission cut a new, shorter, straighter channel over the Blaydon Haugh, leaving behind the Lemington Gut. Also visible are the ruins of the former Tyne Iron Company Ironworks which were built in 1797 and decommissioned in 1886. Its coke ovens are still evident near Lemington Power Station. The power station was built in 1903 to supply the tram system with electricity. It was largely demolished in 1946. The remains of Lemington Staithes can be seen on the Lemington Gut near the power station. The staithes used to mark the end of the North Wylam to Lemington Point waggonway, which took coal from the local collieries to the staithes for export. On 12 July 1875 Lemington Station opened on the Scotswood, Newburn & Wylam Railway. On 15 September 1958 the station closed to passengers and on 4 January 1960 the station was closed to goods, but the lines weren't lifted until 1992, when the Ever Ready battery factory in Newburn closed. The Anglo Great Lakes Graphite Plant which operated in the area, also closed around this time.

In 1843 the Lemington graveyard made way for industrial development. This was later used for school grounds. In the 2000s the school was demolished to make way for housing.

Today, it is largely a residential area of the city and includes the large Dumpling Hall housing estate which was constructed in the 1960s and 1970s.

Notable people 
 

Harold Elsdon (1921–1995), cricketer

References

External links
 Newcastle Council Ward Info: Lemington

Districts of Newcastle upon Tyne
Wards of Newcastle upon Tyne